Biathlon at the 2017 European Youth Winter Olympic Festival is held from 13 to 17 February 2017 at the Kandilli Ski Resort in Erzurum, Turkey.

Medal table

Medal summary

Boys events

Ladies events

Mixed events

References

External links
Results Book – Biathlon

2017 in biathlon
2017 European Youth Olympic Winter Festival events
2017